The 2006 Rhineland-Palatinate state election was held on 26 March 2006 to elect the members of the Landtag of Rhineland-Palatinate. The incumbent coalition government of the Social Democratic Party (SPD) and Free Democratic Party (FDP) led by Minister-President Kurt Beck retained its majority. However, as the SPD won an outright majority, the FDP chose not to continue the coalition. Beck was subsequently re-elected as Minister-President.

Campaign and issues
The election was one of the first held under the grand coalition federal government. Thus, the SPD and CDU did not attack each other as harshly as previously. The SPD was expected to benefit from the personality of Kurt Beck, while the CDU ran again with their leader Christoph Böhr, who had already lost the 2001 election.

Parties
The table below lists parties represented in the previous Landtag of Rhineland-Palatinate.

Opinion polling

Election result

|-
! colspan="2" | Party
! Votes
! %
! +/-
! Seats 
! +/-
! Seats %
|-
| bgcolor=| 
| align=left | Social Democratic Party (SPD)
| align=right| 799,377
| align=right| 45.6
| align=right| 0.8
| align=right| 53
| align=right| 4
| align=right| 52.5
|-
| bgcolor=| 
| align=left | Christian Democratic Union (CDU)
| align=right| 574,329
| align=right| 32.8
| align=right| 2.5
| align=right| 38
| align=right| 0
| align=right| 37.6
|-
| bgcolor=| 
| align=left | Free Democratic Party (FDP)
| align=right| 140,865
| align=right| 8.0
| align=right| 0.2
| align=right| 10
| align=right| 2
| align=right| 9.9
|-
! colspan=8|
|-
| bgcolor=| 
| align=left | Alliance 90/The Greens (Grüne)
| align=right| 81,411
| align=right| 4.6
| align=right| 0.6
| align=right| 0
| align=right| 6
| align=right| 0
|-
| bgcolor=#FF8000| 
| align=left | Labour and Social Justice (WASG)
| align=right| 44,826
| align=right| 2.6
| align=right| New
| align=right| 0
| align=right| New
| align=right| 0
|-
| bgcolor=| 
| align=left | The Republicans (REP)
| align=right| 29,919
| align=right| 1.7
| align=right| 0.7
| align=right| 0
| align=right| ±0
| align=right| 0
|-
| bgcolor=| 
| align=left | Free Voters (FW)
| align=right| 27,652
| align=right| 1.6
| align=right| 0.9
| align=right| 0
| align=right| ±0
| align=right| 0
|-
| bgcolor=| 
| align=left | National Democratic Party (NPD)
| align=right| 21,056
| align=right| 1.2
| align=right| 0.7
| align=right| 0
| align=right| ±0
| align=right| 0
|-
| bgcolor=|
| align=left | Others
| align=right| 33,675
| align=right| 1.9
| align=right| 
| align=right| 0
| align=right| ±0
| align=right| 0
|-
! align=right colspan=2| Total
! align=right| 1,753,110
! align=right| 100.0
! align=right| 
! align=right| 101
! align=right| ±0
! align=right| 
|-
! align=right colspan=2| Voter turnout
! align=right| 
! align=right| 58.2
! align=right| 4.0
! align=right| 
! align=right| 
! align=right| 
|}

Sources
 Rhineland-Palatinate State Statistics Office

2006 elections in Germany
2006